Skyway to Death is a 1974 American TV film directed by Gordon Hessler.

Cast
Ross Martin
Stefanie Powers
John Astin

Reception
The Los Angeles Times called it "a watered down version" of a disaster movie with performances "far better than the material".

References

External links
Skyway to Death at Letterbox DVD

1974 television films
1974 films
Films directed by Gordon Hessler
American television films
American adventure thriller films
1970s adventure thriller films
1970s English-language films
1970s American films